Antoine Loysel, Seigneur of Courroy, Fouilloy and Églantier, (16 February 1536 in Beauvais – 28 April 1617 in Paris), was a French jurisconsult who was notable among jurists for having collected the general principles of old French customary law.

Biography

Family and youth
Loysel was the son of Catherine d'Auvergne and Jean Loisel, an alderman and advisor to the king elected in the election of Beauvais,. His brother, Philippe Loisel, was a civil and criminal lieutenant-general at the bailiwick of Senlis, and master of requests for the Duke of Anjou.
On 2 August 1563, Loysel was prompted to marry Marie de Goulas (1541–1595). De Goulas was a first cousin of Nicolas Goulas and the niece of  lawyer to the king before the Parliament of Paris. They had 12 children.

"He wanted to devote himself to medicine, like his great-uncle Jean Loysel, physician to Louis XII and François I. His father did not approve, saying that despite the danger to which doctors were forced to expose themselves from day to day, a doctor could only ever be a doctor; but a lawyer could become president and chancellor."

In Toulouse, Loysel met Jacques Cujas, who inspired him to continue his studies in law.

Loysel became friends with Pierre Pithou, to whom he was introduced by a mutual acquaintance.

He was, with Nicolas Bergeron, the executor of Ramus.

Career
Successor to Charles Dumoulin, he is considered the first "thinker" of French law.

Loysel was a disciple of Jacques Cujas, whom he followed to Bourges, where he studied the methods of Humanist historians.

In February 1560, he received his lawyer designation in Paris. He became the Attorney General of Paris in 1564.

Some of his notable clients included Francis, Duke of Anjou, brother of Henry III of France, Catherine de Medici, the House of Montmorency, and the chapter of Our Lady of Paris. He ended his career as a public prosecutor at the Chamber of Justice in Limoges.

Loysel was a good follower of mos gallicus - the method of the humanists, which would move him away from the study of Roman law and history. Politically, he was a staunch defender of the king and the powers of the king and would, therefore, consider that the law must be that of the kingdom. He spoke first of a French law before speaking of a "Universal Law of our Kingdom". He believed that customs are "finally reduced to conformity, the reason for a single law". He wrote his work Institutes coutumières in 1607, whose form is Roman and background customary.

Loysel spent 40 years on his collection of the 958 maxims. It is an elegant expression of French law. By merging the rules of many customs and Roman law, Loysel set the foundation for French law.

Quotes

Loysel liked to find formulas to synthesize the law into a series of legal adages. Many are still valid:

Works

Editions published between 1607 and 1846:

1607 - Antoine Loysel, Institutes coutumières: Ou manuel de pluſieurs & diuerſes reigles, ſentences, & Prouerbes tant anciens que modernes du Droict Couſtumier & plus ordinaire de la France, Paris, Abel L'Angelier, 1607, 1 st  ed., 80   p. (notice )
1608 - Antoine Loysel, Institutes coutumières: Ou manuel de pluſieurs & diuerſes reigles, ſentences, & Prouerbes tant anciens que modernes du Droict Couſtumier & plus ordinaire de la France, Paris, Abel L'Angelier, 1608, 79   p. (notice )
1637 - Antoine Loysel, Institutes coutumières: Ou manuel de pluſieurs & diuerſes reigles, ſentences, & Prouerbes tant anciens que modernes du Droict Couſtumier & plus ordinaire de la France, Paris, 1637, 4 th  ed., 79   p. (notice )
1679 - Antoine Loysel, Institutes coutumières: Ou manuel de pluſieurs & diuerſes reigles, ſentences, & Prouerbes tant anciens que modernes du Droict Couſtumier & plus ordinaire de la France, Paris, 1679, 7 th  ed. (notice  )
1710 - Antoine Loysel, Institutes coutumières: Avec des renvois aux Ordonnances de nos Rois, aux Coûtumes & aux Autheurs qui les ont commentées, aux Arrêts, aux anciens Pratticiens, & aux Hiſtoriens dont les regles ont été tirées, Paris,1710, 8 th  ed. (notice  )( Antoine Loysel and Eusèbe Jacques de Laurière ( eds. ), Inſtitutes costumieres, vol.  1,1710 (read on Wikisource, read online  [ archive ] ), Antoine Loysel and Eusèbe Jacques de Laurière (eds.), Inſtitutes costumieres, vol.  2,1710 (read on Wikisource, read online  [ archive ] ))
1758 - Antoine Loysel, Institutes coutumières: Avec des renvois aux Ordonnances de nos Rois, aux Coûtumes & aux Autheurs qui les ont commentées, aux Arrêts, aux anciens Pratticiens, & aux Hiſtoriens dont les regles ont été tirées, Paris, Durand,1758, 9 th  ed. (notice )( Customary Intitutes, vol.  1, Customary Intitutes, vol.  2)
1783 - Antoine Loysel, Institutes coutumières: Avec des renvois aux Ordonnances de nos Rois, aux Coûtumes & aux Autheurs qui les ont commentées, aux Arrêts, aux anciens Pratticiens, & aux Hiſtoriens dont les regles ont été tirées, Paris, Durand,1783, 10 th  ed. (notice )(Institutes coutumières, vol.  1, Institutes coutumières, vol.  2)
1846 - Antoine Loysel, André Marie Jean Jacques Dupin ( dir. ) And Édouard Lefebvre de Laboulaye ( dir. ), Institutes coutumières: Ou manuel de plusieurs et diverses règles, sentences et proverbes, tant anciens que modernes du droit coutumier et plus ordinaire de la France, Paris, Durand,1846, 13 th  ed. (notice , read on Wikisource )( Antoine Loysel, Customary institutes, vol.  1,1846 ( read on Wikisource ), Antoine Loysel, Institutes coutumières, vol.  2, 1846 ( read on Wikisource ))

References
 This article was translated from the equivalent article in French Wikipedia. Retrieved 25 August 2020.

Sources

Bibliography
Jean-Luc A. Chartier, Loisel. Avocat du roi (1536-1617), Paris, 2019, 203 p.
Charles-Louis-Étienne Truinet, "Éloge d'Antoine Loysel prononcé à la séance d'ouverture de la conférence de l'ordre des avocats, le 9 décembre 1852", Paris, C. Lahure, December 1852, 32  p., In-8º
S. de Beaufort, Une famille de lieutenants généraux du bailliage de Senlis aux XVIe et XVIIe siècles, les Loysel, Senlis archaeological committee, 1899
Nègre Desrivières, Notes généalogiques sur la famille Loysel, Loisel, L'Oisel (Avis), seigneurs de Quévremont, de Flambermont, d'Exonviller, etc. - XVe, XVe et XVIIe siècles, Archaeological Committee of Senlis, 1899
Armand Demasure, Antoine Loisel et son temps (1536-1617), Thorin, 1876

French jurists
1536 births
1617 deaths